Wirajroj Chanteng (Thai วิราชโรจน์ จันทร์เต็ง ) is a Thai retired footballer.

External links
Profile at Thaipremierleague.co.th

1981 births
Living people
Wirajroj Chanteng
Wirajroj Chanteng
Association football central defenders
Wirajroj Chanteng